Suchart Mutugun (born 7 April 1934) is a Thai former footballer. He competed in the men's tournament at the 1956 Summer Olympics.

References

External links
 

1934 births
Living people
Suchart Mutugun
Suchart Mutugun
Suchart Mutugun
Footballers at the 1956 Summer Olympics
Place of birth missing (living people)
Association football forwards